Halfdan Long-Leg (Old Norse: Hálfdan háleggur, Norwegian: Halvdan Hålegg) was a Viking-Age warrior who lived in the latter half of the 9th century. He was the son of King Harald Fairhair and a Sami woman named Snæfrithr Svásadottir.

Snorri Sturluson in Heimskringla states that Halfdan was one of Harald's many sons who were involved in a power struggle with one another. Harald Fairhair had pushed Halfdan and his brothers away after the death of their mother. Halfdan and his brother Gudrød Ljome were responsible for murdering Rognvald Eysteinsson and 60 of his men by burning them inside a structure in an attempt to claim his lands. Upon learning of this event, Harald flew into a rage and sent out a great force against Gudrød who was put under Harald's personal observance. Rognvald's son Torf-Einarr performed the Blood eagle ritual on Halfdan in retaliation after a battle. Harald made  Rognvald's son Thorirm  Earl of Møre and gave his daughter Alof to him in marriage.

See also
 Orkneyinga saga

References

Other sources
Crawford, Barbara (1987) Scandinavian Scotland (Leicester University Press) 
Muir, Tom (2005) Orkney in the Sagas: The Story of the Earldom of Orkney as told in the Icelandic Sagas (The Orcadian. Kirkwall) 

Pálsson, Hermann and Edwards, Paul Geoffrey (1981)  Orkneyinga Saga: The History of the Earls of Orkney (Penguin Classics) 

Fairhair dynasty
Viking warriors
Scandinavian Scotland
Orkneyinga saga characters
9th-century Vikings